Guerra Gaucha is the eighth album of Enanitos Verdes published in 1996.
The album featured a number of guest musicians, including famous folk percussionist Domingo Cura (box drum and Peruvian), tango bandoneon player Daniel Binelli, percussionist Luis Conte and singer Ruben Albarrán (of Café Tacuba). Albarrán sings a duet with Marciano Cantero on the song "Ella".
The album's musical style blends rock with traditional tango and Latin American folklore.

It has been regarded as one of the best albums of Enanitos Verdes. Some of the songs that stand out "El dia es claro", "Eterna soledad", "Guerra gaucha", and "Dale Pascual."

The album contains fifteen songs, a controversial production of content, but courageous and respectable by the honesty of its lyrics.

Track listing 

Luis Conte guest percussion on tracks 2, 3, 5, 8, 11, 13, 14 and 15.

1996 albums
Enanitos Verdes albums